Glen Rogers is an unincorporated community in Wyoming County, West Virginia, United States, along the Laurel Fork.

Notable person
 William C. Marland, former Governor of West Virginia

References

Further reading
 Glen Rogers, West Virginia at Abandoned

External links

Unincorporated communities in West Virginia
Unincorporated communities in Wyoming County, West Virginia
Coal towns in West Virginia